Moonfall may refer to:

Fiction
 Moonfall (film), a 2022 film by Roland Emmerich
 Moonfall (novel), a 1998 novel by Jack McDevitt
 Moon Fall series, a 2022 novel series by James Rollins
 Operation Moonfall (video game), a fan extension to The Legend of Zelda: Majora's Mask 3D
 Moonfall (videogame), a 1991 computer game released for the Commodore 64, Amiga and Atari ST; see List of space flight simulation games
 "Moon Fall", a fictional weapon from MÄR; see List of MÄR characters

Music
 "Moonfall" (song), a song from the musical The Mystery of Edwin Drood (musical)
 "Moonfall" (song), a 2006 song by Marina Prior off the album All I Ask of You (album)
 Moonfall (album), a 2005 album by Sasha Lazard

Other uses
 Moonset, setting (falling) of the Moon in the sky, in a cycle of moonrise and moonfall (moonset), analogue to sunset
 "moon-fall", analogue of landfall, to arrive at a moon, in orbit or a moon landing

See also

 Fallen Moon (disambiguation)
 Falling Moon (disambiguation)
 Moon (disambiguation)
 Fall (disambiguation)